Stall Street in Bath, Somerset, England was built by John Palmer between the 1790s and the first decade of the 19th century. The buildings which form an architectural group have listed building status and are now occupied by shops and offices.

The street includes the side of the Grand Pump Room and the attached north and south colonnades. Number 3 Stall Street has the north colonnade attached and is on the corner of Abbey Church Yard and continuous with those buildings. The fountain which stood opposite them has now been moved to Terrace Walk opposite Parade Gardens.

Numbers 5 to 11 were built between 1805 and 1810. Numbers 5 and 6 balance numbers 10 and 11 with giant pilasters which rise up to the second floor.

Numbers 27 to 29 were built around 1820 and form a corner block with buildings in Beau Street. number 29 has a shop front dating from around 1900 with the others being more recent.

Numbers 35 and 36 are on the corner of Bath Street and are consistent with those buildings including the Ionic columns and have been designated as Grade I listed buildings.

Number 37, which forms part of Arlington House, is also Grade I listed.

Gallery

See also

 List of Grade I listed buildings in Bath and North East Somerset

References

Grade I listed buildings in Bath, Somerset
Streets in Bath, Somerset
Grade II listed buildings in Bath, Somerset